Hajji Kizbech Tughuzhuqo  (sometimes misspelled as Ghuz Bek; 1777–1840;) was a Circassian military commander who took part in the Russo-Circassian War. Personally witnessing all of his family get killed by the Russian army, Tughuzhuqo was a cavalry commander especially successful in raiding behind enemy lines. He received multiple offers from the Russian Empire to switch sides and join its Imperial ranks but he refused all offers and closed negotiations. The Englishman James Bell, who knew him personally, called him "The Lion of Circassia".

Biography

Early life 
Tughuzhuqo was born in 1777 in the village of Beannash, to the Shapsug noble house of Sherelh'yqo.

Russo-Circassian War 
Kizbech started his struggle once the Russo-Circassian War reached western Circassia. Between the years 1810-1840, he stormed the Russian garrisons and settlements with a volley of attacks. In 1821, he defeated a Russian campaign on the lands of Shapsug. 

In 1830, Kizbech attacked Elizavinskaya settlement and destroyed it, and in 1834, heading a force of 1700 cavaliers, he brutally defeated a 14 thousand soldier Russian troops. Again, in the same year, he headed 1200 cavaliers to victory over 6 thousand Russian soldiers.

Over many years, he raided several hostile Russian garrisons; Maryanskaya, Georgie, Afepskaya, Apenskaya, and in 1837 while crossing through a field, he was identified by Cossak peasants, who out of their great fear, fled the place leaving behind them 200 sickles. In the same year of 1837, Kizbech stormed the coastal castle of Nikolayev and seized all its properties.

In 1837, accompanied by 250 men, he attacked the right bank of the Kuban Russian fort. As a warrior, Tughuzhuqo enjoyed great respect among opponents. Tsarist generals entered into negotiations with him and repeatedly offered him to join the service of Russia, he rejected all offers. After the failure of his generals to convince him, Tsar Nicholas I tried to personally approach Kizbech to dissuade him from continuing his acts. Kizbech rejected offers of money and continued his raids on Russian garrisons.

In October 1838, he received seven serious wounds, and his sons were injured and eventually died from the injuries. In 1840, Kizbech, heading a group of Circassian cavaliers, captured the garrisons of Waya, Tuapsay, and Shaps.

Circassian revolution 
Circassian revolution started in Shapsug when Kizbech was 18 years old. In this war, the peasants of Shapsug rebelled against their princes. Despite being for the princes’ class, Kizbech took the side of the peasants and was one of the few aristocratic figures that were accepted in the new social structure that the Shapsegh had founded.

Fame 
British adventurer James Bell was impressed by the courage of Kizbech. He witnessed the fear in the hearts of Russian soldiers when hearing Kizbech’s name, and how they dispersed before him after they had seen him.

Russian General Olshevsky wrote:"Shapsugs are considered the fiercest and most dangerous inhabitants of the coasts of the Black Sea ... The Shapsugs were able, thanks to courage and fortitude, to defend themselves and their land, which was proven by inflicting great losses on us, in all cases our forces had to fight them. Among them were strong leaders on the For example, Sherelh'yqo Kizbech Tughuzhuqo". - General Melenty Yakovlevich Olshevsky

Death 
Kizbech Tughuzhuqo died of wounds received in action on February 28, 1840. He had six different fatal wounds at the time. Some other sources claim he died in battle.

Legacy
In 2014, in the 150th anniversary of the end of Russo-Circassian War, a group of Circassian nationalists organized the constructing a monument of Kizbech in the village of Afipsip. As of June 2015 the fundraising was completed and the statue was built.

See also
Russian-Circassian War

References

External links
AdygaAbaza Web-Portal: Тугужуко Казбич 
Biography 

Circassians
Circassian nobility
People of the Caucasian War
Shapsugs
North Caucasian independence activists
Circassian military personnel of the Russo-Circassian War